Philip "The Stick" Kovolick [Kovalick] (September 2, 1908 – April 1971?), also known as Joseph Farvel, was a New York mobster and a longtime associate of labor racketeer Louis Buchalter. He was one of the closest associates of Meyer Lansky, and assisted Meyer and his brother Jake Lansky in operating the Mob's Hallandale Florida casinos, including the plush "rug joint" the Colonial Inn.

Capture and arrest
He was arrested at a restaurant in Little Italy, Manhattan, and charged with "consorting with known criminals for unlawful purposes" in 1965.

Kovolick fled New York to avoid an indictment to appear before a Manhattan grand jury investigating illegal gambling, bribery and corruption. Authorities were attempting to extradite him back to New York before his disappearance, as assistant district attorney Samuel S. Yasgur filed an affidavit in Miami in February 1971.

The body of Philip Kovolick was found sealed in a steel drum at the bottom of a rock pit in Hallandale, Florida on April 28, 1971, after disappearing on April 7, 1971. Police charged 36-year-old John Alvin Baxter with first degree murder, and he was sentenced to death. Eventually the sentence was commuted to life imprisonment.

Further reading
Cohen, Rich. Tough Jews: Fathers, Sons, and Gangster Dreams. New York: Simon & Schuster, 1998. 
Fried, Albert. The Rise and Fall of the Jewish Gangster in America. New York: Holt, Rinehart and Winston, 1980. 
Turkus, Burton B. and Sid Feder. Murder, Inc: The Story of "the Syndicate". New York: Da Capo Press, 2003.

See also
List of solved missing person cases

References

External links
Mug shots of Phillip Kovolick (high-resolution) from Lloyd Sealy Library Digital Collections
Prisoner's Criminal Record [rap sheet] of Phillip Kovolick from Lloyd Sealy Library Digital Collections

1908 births
1970s missing person cases
1971 deaths
1971 murders in the United States
Formerly missing people
Male murder victims
Murdered Jewish American gangsters
Missing gangsters
Missing person cases in Florida
People from Hallandale Beach, Florida
People murdered in Florida
20th-century American Jews